Talgo Avril is a high-speed train that Talgo is developing.  It stands for "Alta Velocidad Rueda Independiente Ligero" (roughly translated as "Light High-Speed Independent Wheel").

Design
It will have front and rear power cars containing under-floor/over-roof equipment and 8 trailer cars in between the power cars, giving a total seating capacity comparable to those of an Electric Multiple Unit rather than a locomotive-hauled train.

Other details:
Versions for fixed gauge (1,435 mm, 1,520 mm or 1,668 mm)  and variable gauge are planned.
The traction system will be compatible with four voltages—25 kV/50 Hz; 15 kV/16.7 Hz; 3 kV DC; 1.5 kV DC.

History
Talgo presented the Avril concept at the InnoTrans fair in Berlin in September 2010.  After several years of development and testing, the first order for Avril trains was placed in November 2016, when Spanish operator Renfe Operadora signed a €786.5 million contract for 15 train sets and 30 years of maintenance. In May 2017, Renfe Operadora ordered 15 more train sets, with the Avril's entry into service expected in 2020.

In 2023, French operator Le Train signed a €300 million contract for 10 train sets and 30 years of maintenance. 

A Talgo Avril train reached 360 km/h top-speed on the Ourense-Santiago de Compostela high-speed line as part of homologation testing.

Gallery

See also
 List of high speed trains
 Talgo

Notes

Talgo
Electric multiple units with locomotive-like power cars
High-speed trains
25 kV AC multiple units
3000 V DC multiple units